Kelly Reichardt (born March 3, 1964) is an American film director and screenwriter. She is known for her minimalist films closely associated with slow cinema, many of which deal with working-class characters in small, rural communities.

Reichardt made her feature film debut with River of Grass (1994) and subsequently directed a series of films set and filmed in Oregon: the dramas Old Joy (2006) and Wendy and Lucy (2008); the Western Meek's Cutoff (2010); and the thriller Night Moves (2013). In 2016, she wrote and directed the Montana-set drama Certain Women, and in 2019 she directed First Cow, set in Oregon.

Early life and education 
Reichardt was born in 1964 and raised in Miami, Florida. She developed a passion for photography when she was young. Her parents were law enforcement officers who separated when she was young. She earned her MFA at the School of the Museum of Fine Arts in Boston. Reichardt has served as the S. William Senfeld Artist in Residence at Bard College since 2006.

Film career
Reichardt's debut film River of Grass was released in 1994. It was nominated for three Independent Spirit Awards, and the Grand Jury Prize at the Sundance Film Festival. It was named one of the best films of 1995 by the Boston Globe, Film Comment, and The Village Voice. Reichardt then had trouble making another feature film, saying, "I had 10 years from the mid-1990s when I couldn’t get a movie made. It had a lot to do with being a woman. That’s definitely a factor in raising money. During that time, it was impossible to get anything going, so I just said, ‘Fuck you!’ and did Super 8 shorts instead."

In 1999, Reichardt completed her second feature, Ode, based on Herman Raucher's novel Ode to Billy Joe. Next she made two short films, Then a Year, in 2001, and Travis, which deals with the Iraq War, in 2004. In these two films, critics have noted that she subtly makes clear her displeasure with the Bush administration and its handling of the Iraq War.

Most of Reichardt's films are regarded by critics to be part of the minimalist movement in films, though Reichardt sees a difference between her work and the movement as a whole.

After Todd Haynes, a close friend of Reichardt, made Safe, she drove Haynes to Portland from the Seattle Film Festival, where she met writer Jon Raymond and Neil Kopp, who respectively wrote and produced several of Reichardt's films. In 2006, she completed Old Joy, based on a short story in Raymond's collection Livability. Daniel London and singer-songwriter Will Oldham portray two friends who reunite for a camping trip to the Cascades and Bagby Hot Springs, near Portland. The film won awards from the Los Angeles Film Critics Association, Rotterdam International Film Festival, and Sarasota Film Festival. Notably, it was the first American film to win the Tiger Award at the Rotterdam Film Festival. Kopp won the Producer's Award at the 2007 Independent Spirit Awards for his work on Old Joy and Paranoid Park.

For her next film, Wendy and Lucy, Reichardt and Raymond adapted another story from Livability. The film explores loneliness and hopelessness through the story of a woman looking for her lost dog. It was released in December 2008 and earned Oscar buzz for lead actress Michelle Williams. It was nominated for Best Film and Best Female Lead at the Independent Spirit Awards. Reichardt then directed Meek's Cutoff, a Western also starring Williams. It competed for the Golden Lion at the 67th Venice International Film Festival in 2010.

In 2013, Reichardt's film Night Moves debuted in competition at the 70th Venice International Film Festival. A more intense thriller about a secret plot to blow up a dam, it was considered a shift in tone from her other slower, more melancholic films. 

Reichardt's film Certain Women is based on Maile Meloy's 2009 short-story collection Both Ways is the Only Way I Want It, and was shot in March–April 2015 in Montana. Michelle Williams, Laura Dern, and Kristen Stewart star. Sony Pictures Worldwide Acquisitions (SPWA) bought the rights to distribution. The film premiered on January 24, 2016, at the Sundance Film Festival. Reichardt won the top award at the 2016 London Film Festival for Certain Women.

In October 2016, Reichardt revealed that on her next film she would collaborate with author Patrick DeWitt on an adaptation of his novel Undermajordomo Minor, which might be shot outside of the U.S. In October 2018, it was announced that Reichardt had put Undermajordomo Minor on hold and would instead reunite with Raymond to direct First Cow, an adaptation of his novel The Half-Life.

Reichardt's films have received positive reviews from critics, with all of them above 80% (certified fresh) on the film reviews aggregator website Rotten Tomatoes, with the highest being River of Grass and First Cow (both 95%). Her films have not been big box-office successes, with Certain Women the most successful at $1.1 million.

Reichardt is an Artist-in-Residence in the Film and Electronic Arts program at Bard College. She has received a 2009 John Simon Guggenheim Memorial Foundation Fellowship and a 2011 United States Artists (USA) Fellowship. She edits her films herself.

Style and themes 
Reichardt's films have often been called minimalist and realist, with film critic A. O. Scott describing Wendy and Lucy as part of a new American Independent cinema he termed "Neo-Neo Realism", primarily due to its thematic and aesthetic similarity to classic Italian neorealist films such as Rome Open City and Paisan. Reichardt has called her films "just glimpses of people passing through". She also recognizes her style as minimalist, saying, "A movie is a series of reveals, essentially, and then you're supposed to sit in a room and tell someone what it all means. That goes against everything that I just worked for, so I have no interest in summing it all up. It's all out there". Her films' realist tendencies position them in line with Matthew Flanagan's idea of slow cinema. Their long takes, minimal dialogue and minimalist action are all characteristics of slow cinema that allow the audience time for contemplation. This style may also be in response to more mainstream films; Reichardt has said, "when I go to the movies and I sit through the previews, I literally feel assaulted."

Reichardt's films often focus on characters on the margins of society, who are not usually represented on screen, or who are seeking a better quality of life and place in the world. She is interested in characters "who don’t have a net, who if you sneezed on them, their world would fall apart". Her films tackle aspects of the American experience the commercial film industry seldom explores. Eric Kohn of Indiewire has called her films "a mesmerizing statement on the solitude of everyday life for working-class people who want something better. They’re trapped between a mythology of greatness and the personal limitations that govern their drab realities. By attending to atmosphere and attitude as much as plot, Reichardt has quietly become one of the country’s best chroniclers of the American experience".

Reichardt's films often contain references to modern times and political events. Of Meek’s Cutoff, she said, "Here was the story of this braggart leading a bunch of people into the desert without a plan and becoming completely reliant on the locals who are socially different from him and who he is suspicious of. All of which seemed relevant to the moment" (in reference to the Iraq War and George W. Bush). Reichardt has confirmed that the character Meek was meant to resemble Bush. Wendy and Lucy also reflects the economic hardships that affected millions of Americans (particularly women, whom the film suggests are affected more than men) as a result of the high costs and collateral damage from the war. Reichardt's 2013 film Night Moves has more overt political references. The three protagonists are radical environmentalists, and the film is set in Oregon, a state with many notable instances of environmental protest, particularly against its lumber industry and in defense of the Northern Spotted Owl, an indicator species of the Pacific Northwest. Reichardt has said, "Jon Raymond wanted to write a script about a group of fundamentalists and instead of looking to the right, he wrote about these young lefty radicals—people with a more relatable and, to our eyes, a more justified agenda. [...] I think what drew me to the Jon Raymond stories is his ability to write politically without writing politically. There’s no message in a Raymond story, no clear ideological path. It’s all murky territory, and murky is more of a challenge than a straight shot to something. Ultimately they are all character films."

Critics have noted that Reichardt's films often have ambiguous endings that leave the audience hanging and unsatisfied. Xan Brooks of The Guardian uses the examples of "wonky Kurt, left wandering city streets at the end of Old Joy, hapless Wendy, still looking for Alaska, or Meek’s Cutoff’s lost pioneers, forever strung between triumph and disaster. These films do not so much resolve as dissolve. They leave us dangling, forced to write their third acts in our heads”. Reichardt has said, "Maybe I’m suspicious of absolutes. I mean, yes, there is something satisfying about watching an old film when the music rises up and the words come at you: The End. But it would seem absurd to do that at the end of one of my films. It would just make them feel lopsided, because they’re all so short, they cover so little time. We don’t know where these people were before. We spent a week with them and then on they went". She has also said that she enjoys films that let the audience find their own way in and come to their own conclusions.

Reichardt's films contain feminist ideas in both style and content, rejecting mainstream commercial filmmaking methods and focusing on gender (most have female lead characters), but she rejects the label "feminist filmmaker". She rejects mainstream methods by using small budgets, filming on location (most of her films are shot in Oregon), and refusing to romanticize her characters and their struggles. Even her films that have male protagonists address gender issues. In Old Joy, which stars two men and was spoken about at festivals as an LGBT film, the theme of male friendship is highlighted and addressed through feminized qualities of sensitivity and vulnerability rarely seen in mainstream Hollywood cinema. In Night Moves, Dakota Fanning's character serves as a strong female counterpoint to Jesse Eisenberg's male protagonist, and the film's environmental storyline reflects eco-feminist values. Reichardt also diverges from the mainstream with her films' avant-garde content. River of Grass segments the narrative into numbered sections, and Certain Women is also divided into episodes. Reichardt's realism and camera angles reject the objectification of bodies and challenge audience expectations by lingering on seemingly insignificant images after characters have left a scene.

Reichardt has frequently collaborated with actress Michelle Williams, saying that she enjoys Williams's confidence and inquisitive nature, and that she can never guess what she's going to do.

Filmography 
Film

Short film

Accolades

Bibliography
 James Lattimer, Eva Sangiorgi, ed., Textur #2: Kelly Reichardt. Viennale – Vienna International Film Festival 2020,

See also
Social realism
Minimalist film

References

Sources

External links

 
 
 
 
 

American women screenwriters
American women film directors
Bard College faculty
Living people
1964 births
Film directors from Florida
Writers from Miami
Screenwriters from Florida
20th-century American women writers
20th-century American writers
21st-century American women writers
21st-century American writers
American women academics